Karolak is a Polish surname. Notable people with the surname include:

 Stanisław Karolak (1931–2009) – Polish romanist and slavist
 Wojciech Karolak (1939–2021) – Polish jazzman
 Czesław Karolak (born 1946) – Polish Germanist
 Tomasz Karolak (born 1971) – Polish actor and vocalist

Notes